The Andean tit-spinetail (Leptasthenura andicola) is a species of bird in the family Furnariidae. It is found in Bolivia, Chile, Colombia, Ecuador, Peru, and Venezuela.

Its natural habitats are subtropical or tropical moist montane forest, subtropical or tropical high-altitude shrubland, and subtropical or tropical high-altitude grassland.

References

Andean tit-spinetail
Birds of the Andes
Birds of the Northern Andes
Andean tit-spinetail
Andean tit-spinetail
Taxonomy articles created by Polbot